= Lakshmi Narayan Devasthan, Kundaim =

Hindu temple in Kundaim, Goa, India

Coordinates: 15°26′57″N 73°57′18″E

Lakshmi Narayan Devasthan is a Hindu temple situated in the Dasol wada (precinct) of Kundai village in Goa. The primary deity of the temple is Shri Mahalakshmi, historically known as Adoskann or Adoshikirin, who is worshipped alongside Shri Narayan.

== History ==
The origins of the deity trace back to the village of Adoshi (or Azoshi) in the Tiswadi region, where she was initially venerated as the gramdevi (village goddess). The settlement of Adoshi was originally established by the kulavi mahajans (founding families) of the Mahalakshmi goddess from Colva in the Salcete region, with the assistance of the local Gawda community. Upon establishing their village institution (gramsanstha), they consecrated the idol of Shri Mahalakshmi.

The Adoshi village institution originally comprised three clans or vangods belonging to the Brahmin community. During the 16th century, religious persecution and conversions initiated by the Portuguese led to the first and third vangods converting to Christianity (Catholic Brahmins). The members of the second vangod, however, retained their Hindu faith and bore the surname Bhandari.

In 1540, Portuguese authorities destroyed multiple shrines in the Tiswadi village of Adoshi. This included temples dedicated to Mhalkumi (Mahalakshmi), Saptnath, Ravalnath, Narayan, Sati Bhumidevata, Vandevata, Grampurus, and Ishwar. Following the destruction and conversions, the Hindu Brahmins of the second vangod relocated their deity to Kundaim, where the current temple was established.

== Architecture and layout ==
The temple complex is situated on an elevated terrain within Kundaim's Dasol wada. To the left of the main structure lies a smaller shrine dedicated to Shri Ravalnath.

Within the temple's main sanctum (garbhagriha), the primary idol of Shri Mahalakshmi is crafted from panchaloha (a five-metal alloy) and is seated upon a murvyasana. Positioned immediately next to the goddess is a smaller idol of Shri Narayan.

== Festivals and observances ==
The temple observes several religious events and rituals throughout the Hindu lunar calendar:

- Bi-monthly observances: The eighth day (Ashtami) of both the bright and dark fortnights (Shukla and Krishna paksha) of every month is considered a highly auspicious day (parvani). It is marked by a nighttime palanquin (palakhi) procession.
- Chaitra: The Shukla Ashtami features spring worship (Vasantpuja), a palanquin procession, and a ceremonial feast (phalahar).
- Ashadh: The Shukla Ekadashi involves devotional singing, including bhajanotsav and namasankirtan.
- Shravan: Special rituals utilizing jasmine (jayo) flowers are performed on every Friday of the month.
- Bhadrapada: The Shukla Chaturdashi is celebrated as Shri Anantavratotsav.
- Ashwin: The Navaratri period spans from the first day (Padyami) to the ninth day (Navami). It features Chandipath and Ghatasthapana on the first day, a palanquin procession on the eighth day, and jasmine flower worship on the ninth. The tenth day (Dashami or Dasro) is marked by Shimolanghan. At 5:00 PM on this day, the deity is carried in a palanquin procession (shibikarudha swari) with a full retinue for the Shimolanghan ritual before returning to the temple. Subsequent rituals, including Kakad Aarti and Harijagar, continue until the full moon (Purnima).
- Kartik: On the tenth day of the dark fortnight, the deity is carried in a palanquin early in the morning to a designated sacred spot (ped) within the local grounds. Following the worship, a community forest feast (vanabhojan) takes place.
- Phalgun: The month features the Holikapujan festival.

== Mahajans ==
The primary patrons (mahajans) of the temple are Goud Saraswat Brahmins of the Madhva tradition. The majority of these affiliates belong to the Bharadwaj gotra and bear the surname Bhandari. They are predominantly settled in Kumbharjua, Bandode, Kapileshwari, Goa Velha (Vodlem Gõy), Panaji, Margao, Mormugao, and Mumbai. Additionally, the temple's mahajans include a specific family based in Mumbai with the surname Kinare, who belong to the Kaundinya gotra.
